Korean-American director Joseph Kahn has directed 182 music videos, 4 films, and 2 television shows. He is also credited as a photography director in 4 music videos.

Kahn is also a cinematographer, executive producer, screenwriter and editor for various films and music videos. 

Kahn has won 9 awards for his work, including the Grammy Award for Best Music Video for American singer-songwriter Taylor Swift's "Bad Blood" and American rapper Eminem's "Without Me".

Music videos

Filmography

Films

Television

References

Citations

External links 
 
 
 Joseph Kahn commercials on Advertising Age

Director videographies
Director filmographies